The Urdu movement was a socio-political movement aimed at making Urdu the universal language and symbol of the cultural and political identity of the Muslim communities of the Indian subcontinent during the British Raj. The movement began with the fall of the Mughal Empire in the mid-19th century, fuelled by the Aligarh movement of Sir Syed Ahmed Khan. It strongly influenced the All India Muslim League and the Pakistan movement.

History

Hindi-Urdu controversy

The Hindi-Urdu controversy arose in 1867 when the British government prepared to accept the demand of the Hindu communities of the United Provinces (now Uttar Pradesh) and Bihar to change the Perso-Arabic script of the official language to Devanagari and adopt Hindi as the second official language on demand of Hindu activists. Muslim politician Sir Syed Ahmed Khan became the most vocal opponent of this change. He viewed Urdu as the lingua franca of Muslims. Having been developed by the ruling Mughal Empire, what became known as Urdu was used as a secondary language to Persian, the official language of the Mughal court. Since the decline of the Mughal dynasty, Sir Syed promoted the use of Urdu through his own writings. Under Sir Syed, the Scientific Society of Aligarh translated Western works only into Urdu. Sir Syed considered Urdu to be "a common legacy of Hindus and Muslims". The schools established by Sir Syed imparted education in the Urdu-medium. The demand for Hindi, led largely by Hindus was to Sir Syed an erosion of the centuries-old Muslim cultural domination of India.
Testifying before the British-appointed education commission, Sir Syed controversially exclaimed that "Urdu was the language of gentry and of people of high social standing, whereas Hindi was to be the vulgar." His remarks provoked a hostile response from Hindu leaders and advocates of Hindi. ". The Hindus unified across the region to demand the recognition of Hindi. The success of the Hindi movement led Sir Syed to further advocate Urdu as the symbol of Muslim heritage and as the language of the Muslim intellectual and political class. His educational and political work grew increasingly centred on and exclusively for Muslim interests. He also sought to persuade the British to give it extensive official use and patronage.

Urdu in Muslim politics

Sir Syed's call for the adoption of Urdu as the language of Indian Muslims won extensive support from the Aligarh Movement and Muslim religious activists of the Deobandi and Wahabbi schools. Muslim religious and political leaders Mohsin-ul-Mulk and Maulvi Abdul Haq developed organisations such as the Urdu Defence Association and the Anjuman Taraqqi-i-Urdu, committed to the perpetuation of Urdu. Sir Syed's protege Shibli Nomani led efforts that resulted in the adoption of Urdu as the official language of the Hyderabad State and as the medium of instruction in the Osmania University. This political campaign was criticised for making the use of Urdu a political issue that served as a wedge between Muslims and Hindus, who saw Sir Syed's advocacy as an effort to re-establish Muslim hegemony. To Muslims in northern and western India, Urdu became an integral part of political identity and communal separatism. The division over the use of Hindi or Urdu would further fuel communal conflict between Muslims and Hindus in India. The All India Muslim League and the Jamaat-e-Islami projected Urdu as essential for the political and cultural survival of Islamic society in India. Muslim politicians like Muhammad Ali Jinnah, Sir Muhammad Iqbal, Liaquat Ali Khan emphasised Urdu as the symbol of Muslim heritage and political identity. The political cause of Urdu became a core issue at the heart of the Two-Nation Theory, which advocated that Muslims and Hindus were irreconcilably separate nations. Advocates of the Pakistan movement sought to make Urdu a key argument in drawing distinctions with India's Hindu-majority population. Muslim religious leaders such as Maulana Mohammad Ali, Maulana Shaukat Ali and Maulana Maududi emphasised the knowledge of Urdu as essential for ordinary and religious Muslims.

Urdu in Pakistan and India

In Pakistan, Urdu has been so far, the National language and the Lingua franca, while English holds the status as one of the official languages of the state. However, this policy caused considerable political turmoil in East Bengal, which was home to Bengali-speaking population who constituted the majority of the population of Pakistan. Jinnah, most West Pakistani politicians emphasised that only Urdu would be recognised officially. This intensified the cultural and political gulf between West Pakistan and East Pakistan. The East Pakistan Awami Muslim League (the predecessor of the Awami League), established by A. K. Fazlul Huq, Huseyn Shaheed Suhrawardy and Sheikh Mujibur Rahman in 1949 would lead the demand for the recognition of Bengali. Intensifying protests and strikes led by political groups, unions and students groups would lead to the imposition of martial law. The killing of protesting students by police in 1952 triggered a massive wave of protests in the province, which would come to be known as the Bengali Language Movement. Although politicians like Khwaja Nazimudin supported the cause of Urdu, a vast majority of Bengali nationalists saw the government policy as a symbol of racial discrimination. This wedge in Pakistani society would ultimately lead to the Bangladesh Liberation War and the establishment of Bangladesh in 1971.

Independent India adopted Urdu as one of its 22 scheduled languages although its counterpart, Hindi, enjoys the status of official language. Urdu is also officially recognised by the states of Jammu and Kashmir, Uttar Pradesh, Telangana, Bihar and Delhi. Urdu is widely used by Indian Muslims across the country and there are a large number of Urdu-medium schools, colleges and universities, including madrassahs, the Jamia Millia Islamia and the Aligarh Muslim University. Urdu is also a part of popular culture, media and publications. Numerous Urdu language films have been produced, which include Umrao Jaan, Shatranj Ke Khiladi and Pakeezah.

Despite being given the status of a scheduled language, there have been concerns that the Urdu language has largely been on a decline in India. This decline has been attributed to reasons such as lack of promotional policies by central language regulation boards, the promulgation and preference of Urdu's counterpart Hindi as the Indian union's official language since 1950, the higher number of Hindi-speakers in India leading to the suppression of Urdu, the partition of India and Urdu's national language status in Pakistan overshadowing the language's prospects in India, as well as the lack of many schools in India teaching Urdu as a medium of instruction.

See also
 Urdu
 Pakistan movement
 Hindi-Urdu controversy
 Aligarh Movement
 Anti-Hindi agitations of Tamil Nadu

References

 Urdu
 Demographic history of India
Islam in India
 History of South Asia
 Demographic history of Pakistan
Sociolinguistics
 Language conflict in India
 Urdu-language literary movements